Ali Karimi (born 1978) is an Iranian footballer who won Asian Footballer of the Year in 2004.

Ali Karimi may also refer to:
 Ali Karimi (footballer, born 1982), Iranian football striker who played for Saipa, Tractor Sazi, and Shahrdari Tabriz
 Ali Karimi (footballer, born 1994), Iranian international footballer who plays for Sepahan, Dinamo Zagreb, and Esteghlal